Othernet Inc is a broadcast data company that was previously known as Outernet. Due to trademark issues, the name of the company and service was changed in July 2018. Othernet sells a portable satellite data receiver that combines an amplifier, radio, and CPU in a single unit. The company's goal is to make news, information, and education accessible to everyone.

Othernet's stated goal is to provide free access to content from the web through geostationary and low Earth orbit satellites, made available effectively to all parts of the world. The project currently uses datacasting conventional geostationary communications satellites in a satellite constellation network. Wi-Fi enabled devices would communicate with the satellite hotspots, which receive data broadcasts from satellites.

It received its initial investment from the Media Development Investment Fund, a United States-based impact investment fund and non-profit organization established in 1995 by Saša Vučinić and Stuart Auerbach. In 2015, Outernet (now Othernet) also launched an IndieGogo campaign, which raised $697,552 to finance the development of the Lantern receiver which was never completed and delivered to backers.

History 
Othernet turned on their first public satellite signal on 11 August 2014. Othernet transmitted 20 Mbits per day when it was using the L-band. Othernet provided instructions for users to build their own receivers and encouraged people to do so, then to share their results with Othernet. Othernet's first signal was broadcast over Galaxy 19 and Hot Bird, covering North America, Europe, and parts of the Middle East and North Africa.

On 1 October 2014, Othernet released a major update that included a redesign of the Othernet website and the release of Whiteboard, their content suggestion platform that allows anyone to suggest a URL for broadcast. Once a URL is submitted, other visitors may vote on it with the URLs receiving the most votes entering the Othernet broadcast carousel. The Othernet broadcast is broken into three categories: the Queue, Sponsored Content, and the Core Archive. Content in the Queue is decided via votes on Whiteboard as well as requests via the Othernet Facebook page. Othernet plans to expand the avenues through which it is able to receive requests for content. Anyone can view what is being broadcast on Othernet at any time.

According to MDIF, the initial content access includes international and local news, crop prices for farmers, Teachers Without Borders, emergency communications such as disaster relief, applications and content such as Ubuntu, movies, music, games, and Wikipedia in its entirety.

Requests to NASA to use the International Space Station to test their technology were declined in June 2014 due to, as stated by a letter sent by the Center for the Advancement of Science in Space (CASIS) to the staff working for Othernet, both inaccuracies within the proposition, such as "it is assumed that the NanoLab housing will be provided by the CASIS program outside the budget", and costs ranging from US$150,000 to $175,000. This resulted in the CASIS operations review stating in the letter that "the likelihood for mission success as proposed is not probable".

Signal reception 
Originally a device called the "Lantern" (previously known as Pillar), a data receiver and media storage system, was designed and developed by Othernet that is a "completely self-contained, high-speed receiver" that is "solar-powered, weatherproof, and creates a wireless hotspot to allow WiFi-enabled devices to access content." The purpose of the Lantern, as stated by Othernet, is to provide free access to the media archive, weather, news, and other resources, through Outernet, in high traffic public locations, such as schools.

Another way to access the transmissions sent by Othernet was to build a receiver, which requires certain components, including an L-band antenna, low-noise amplifier, and DVB-T dongle with a special RTL-SDR driver to open up its debug mode SDR reception, the data received was stored on a user supplied computing device with the othernet decoding software, the received and stored content was then made accessible when a Wi-Fi dongle is connected to the hotspot, though this L-band signal service has now been discontinued though the hardware is still able to receive other L-band INMARSAT signals.

The current Outernet/Othernet system which is a series of hardware testing versions currently codenamed Dreamcatcher of the eventual final Lantern is using the Ku-band with a LNB which interfaces with and is decoded by a LoRa circuit on the ARM architecture based receiver board which downloads to update the onboard stored content and resources from the satellite at 20 kbit/s, this constantly updating content cache is accessible by connecting to the Othernet receiver's Wi-Fi using Wi-Fi equipped devices and viewed using that device's web browser and not requiring any special app. Ku-band service to North America is provided by SES-2 at 87° West and for Europe by Astra 3B at 23.5° East geostationary orbit locations.

Availability 
The Othernet project is raising funds to expand globally, in order to reach third world countries or populations lacking basic access to the Internet. The amount of funds necessary to kickstart the project was US$200,000. By 8 June 2015, $628,305 had been raised.

Purpose 
Othernet has stated three specific goals when developing Othernet: to provide information without censorship for educational and emergency purposes. They have stated that they plan to provide information about "news, civic information, commodity prices, weather, construction plans for open source farm machinery" and other types of information. They also have stated that they will be providing access to "courseware", which includes textbooks, videos, and software. Othernet will be available also when access to regular Internet connection is down for any reason.

Media coverage 
Media coverage over the Othernet has ranged from excitement to skepticism. A CNN video released on February 24, 2014, goes into detail of how the idea seems great, but has many drawbacks due to costs and the feasibility of the project. Other media outlets that have brought up the Othernet include the Washington Post and NBC. Media coverage has also gone into other competing projects that have surfaced, such as Google's Project Loon and Facebook's Internet.org.

There has also been debate over the politics involved in the introduction of the Othernet to the public. Many fears exist over whether "the major telecom companies worldwide will fight the plans for space-based broadcasting of information readily available on the Internet."

A BBC News report summarized Karim's TEDGlobal talk, observing that illiteracy will be a limiting factor for rural adoption.

See also 
 Internet
 Internet.org, a partnership that plans to bring affordable access to selected Internet services to less developed countries.
 Project Loon, working on providing Internet access to rural and remote areas. The company uses high-altitude balloons.
 Wikipedia Zero, a project by the Wikimedia Foundation to provide Wikipedia free of charge on mobile phones via zero-rating, ended in 2018.
 Toosheh (Knapsack for Hope), A similar satellite data down-streaming NGO service which uses common satellite TV equipment to record the data signal then decode it with a computer or mobile device.

References

External links 
 

Satellite Internet access
Information Age
American companies established in 2014
Digital technology
Mass media technology
Scientific revolution
Telegraphy